Kaitlyn Jade Judges Fassina (born 17 July 1990) is an Australian weightlifter. She competed in the women's 90 kg event at the 2018 Commonwealth Games, winning the silver medal.

Medalbox note

References

External links
 

1990 births
Living people
Australian female weightlifters
Weightlifters at the 2018 Commonwealth Games
Commonwealth Games silver medallists for Australia
Commonwealth Games medallists in weightlifting
Sportspeople from Hobart
Sportswomen from Tasmania
20th-century Australian women
21st-century Australian women
Medallists at the 2018 Commonwealth Games